Scott Ian Rubenstein (September 28, 1947 - July 25, 2019) was an American television writer and story editor best known for the latter in Star Trek: The Next Generation. He also wrote the TNG episode "The Dauphin". Some of Rubenstein's other television writing credits included 9 to 5,  Diff'rent Strokes, Night Court, Cagney & Lacey, Benson, MacGyver, It's Garry Shandling's Show, Born Free, and What's Happening Now!!.

Career
Scott Rubenstein was also co-owner of L.A. Tax Service (started in 1982) and worked as an Accountant and writer. He won Funniest Account in Los Angeles in the 1990s. Before his writing career began, Scott was a teacher in the Peace Corps, stationed in the Philippines. After returning home, he taught in Sacramento at Christian Brothers and he entered and won a writing contest through 20th Century Fox, which brought him to Los Angeles where he joined as a member of 20th century Fox's Comedy writing workshop. There be began his writing career and has written over 30 episodes of television. Scott co-wrote many episodes with this writing partner, Leonard Mlodinow. Scott co-wrote Peacock Blues with wife and director Devo Cutler-Rubenstein for Showtime and it won best Short Film at Moondance Film Festival. He also co-wrote the award winning documentary Not Afraid to Laugh. Scott has worked as an Adjunct Professor and taught Screen Writing, Comedy Writing and Screen Writing Adaptations in multiple settings, including at the California State University Northridge and University of Southern California. Scott and L.A. Tax Service was featured on Jon Stewart's The Daily Show in a segment called Hustle and Cash Flow and he played a small part on an episode of the New Girl as Mr. Scott Rubenstein. He was also a part of Improv workshops with Aretha Sills, the granddaughter of Viola Spolin. Scott was born in New York, New York to Jewish Parents. His father was a prisoner of war in World War II and held captive by the Japanese. His father was held as a prisoner in the Philippines and survived the Bataan Death March and the Hell Ships. His mother was a writer and bookkeeper. Scott has been best friends with Actor Sal Viscuso since they met while attending the University of California Davis (Scott graduated in 1969). He is survived by daughter Artist Sara Gavin and son Aaron Rubenstein, co-owner LA Tax.

Filmography

Peacock Blues (TV Short)   1990
The New Adam-12 (TV Series) (writer)
The Landlord (1990) (writer)  1990 
Night Court (TV Series) (writer)
 Futureman (1990) (writer)  1989 
Hunter (TV Series) (writer)
 Shield of Honor (1989) (writer)
Star Trek: The Next Generation (TV Series) (story editor - 9 episodes, 1988 - 1989) (writer, 1989)
 The Royale (1989, story editor)
 Contagion (1989, story editor)
 The Dauphin (1989, (written and sort editor)
 The Measure of a Man (1989, story editor)
 A Matter of Honor (1989, story editor)  Show all 9 episodes 1987
MacGyver (TV Series) (written by - 1 episode)
 Hell Week (1987)   1987 
What's Happening Now! (TV Series) (1 episode)
 Raj on the Double (1987)  1982-1986
Nine to Five (TV Series) (written by - 2 episodes)
 The Russians Are Coming (1986)
 The China Sin-Drome (1982)   1985 
Cagney & Lacey (TV Series) (written by - 2 episodes)
 The Psychic (1985)   - Stress (1985)   1984 
Benson (TV Series) (written by - 1 episode)
 Embarrassing Moments (1984)
Diff'rent Strokes (TV Series) (written by - 2 episodes, 1981 - 1982) (story by - 1 episode, 1980) (teleplay by - 1 episode, 1980)
 The Older Woman (1982)
 Growing Up (1981)
 Substitute Mother (1980)

References

External links

1947 births
2019 deaths
American television writers
Jewish American writers
American male television writers
Peace Corps volunteers
University of California, Davis alumni
Writers from Brooklyn
21st-century American Jews